Sir Richard Beaumont, 1st Baronet JP (2 August 1574 – 28 October 1631) was an English politician who sat in the House of Commons in 1625.

Beaumont was a son of Edward Beaumont and Elizabeth Ramsden, daughter of John Ramsden. He was knighted by James I of England in 1609. In 1613, he commanded two hundred train-band soldiers per commission. Two years later he was a justice of the peace of the County of York. In 1625 Beaumont was elected Member of Parliament (MP) for Pontefract in the Useless Parliament. On 15 August 1628 Charles I created him a baronet, of Whitley, in the County of York.

He built the stately home, Whitley Beaumont near Huddersfield, West Yorkshire.

Beaumont died unmarried and with his death the baronetcy became extinct.

References

1574 births
1631 deaths
Baronets in the Baronetage of England
English MPs 1625
English knights
16th-century English people